Vasily Ivanov (born 8 November 1972) is a Russian former swimmer who won silver medals in the 4×100 m medley relay at the 1992 Summer Olympics and 1994 World Aquatics Championships. He also won three gold medals in the 50 m breaststroke at the European Short Course Swimming Championships of 1991–1993. In 1991, he set a world record in the 100 m breaststroke (long course).

Ivanov specialized in sprint disciplines in short-course competitions (25 m pool) due to his massive body structure, which was well adapted to a strong start and fast and powerful turns at the wall. After retirement from swimming in 1994–1995 he worked as a vice-president of the housing company PTS-Servis in Samara. He also played ice hockey for a local team and competed in swimming in the masters category. He is married and has three daughters.

References

1972 births
Living people
Russian male swimmers
Male breaststroke swimmers
Olympic swimmers of the Unified Team
Swimmers at the 1992 Summer Olympics
Olympic silver medalists for the Unified Team
World Aquatics Championships medalists in swimming
Medalists at the 1992 Summer Olympics
Olympic silver medalists in swimming
Sportspeople from Samara, Russia